Election for Edinburgh Corporation were held on Tuesday 3 November 1896, alongside municipal elections across Scotland, and the wider British local elections. The election was relatively quiet, with no particularly important issues being raised, and contests took place in only 2 of the cities 13 wards, with candidates in the remaining 11 being returned unopposed.

The election followed the annexation of Portobello to Edinburgh, and the three new Portobello wards had to elect their initial representation. Contests took place in two of the three Portobello wards, with Portobello West and Portobello east seeing contests. Portobello would in total contribute 5 Unionist and 4 Liberal councillors. This gave the new council a slight Unionist majority.

Ward Results

Canongate

Portobello West

Portobello East

St. Bernards

References

1896
1896 Scottish local elections
November 1896 events